Richard Scott Kotschau (born November 22, 1975) is an American former soccer player who last played as a defender for the Real Salt Lake of Major League Soccer.

Club career
Kotschau was born in Levittown, New York. After playing college soccer at George Mason University, where he helped his team to their first-ever NCAA Tournament appearance, Kotschau was drafted by the Chicago Fire second overall in the 1998 MLS College Draft. Although he helped the Fire to the MLS Cup and US Open Cup double in his rookie year he was traded to the Tampa Bay Mutiny midway through the 1999 season.

Midway through 2001, Kotschau was part of the deal that sent Carlos Valderrama to the Colorado Rapids. With Colorado, Ritchie was a first-choice player, played a number of defensive roles, and scored his first MLS goal. After the 2005 season, he was dealt to the Crew for Cornell Glen. While with the Columbus Crew defender Ritchie Kotschau was named the Huntington man of the year by the Columbus Crew. The award is presented to the player who embodies an exceptional sense of leadership, civic pride, family values and community service.  Kotschau, 30, in his first season with the Crew, appeared in 26 games, starting 23. The nine-year MLS veteran wore the captain’s armband 17 times this season and recorded one goal and two assists. That goal was a game-winner.
In ten years in MLS, Kotschau scored nine regular season goals and added 15 assists.

International career
Kotschau earned his first cap for the United States national team on March 9, 2005, against Colombia and was a former member of the U-23, U-20, B and U-18 teams.

Personal life
Kotschau now lives in Broomfield, Colorado where he is employed by Life Time Fitness as the Member Engagement Manager. Kotschau is married with two children.

References

External links
 

1975 births
Living people
American soccer players
Association football defenders
United States men's international soccer players
Major League Soccer players
George Mason Patriots men's soccer players
Chicago Fire FC players
Tampa Bay Mutiny players
Colorado Rapids players
Columbus Crew players
Real Salt Lake players
People from Broomfield, Colorado
People from Levittown, New York
Soccer players from New York (state)
Chicago Fire FC draft picks